One More Car, One More Rider is the eighth live album by Eric Clapton, released on 5 November 2002 on Duck / Reprise Records. It is also his third double live album. The album contains songs performed during Clapton's 2001 world tour. The recordings on this album are from two nights at the Staples Center in Los Angeles, 18 & 19 August 2001. Accompanying Clapton on this album are guitarist Andy Fairweather-Low, drummer Steve Gadd, bassist Nathan East and keyboardists Billy Preston, Greg Phillinganes and David Sancious (who also plays guitar and melodica). Clapton claimed that this would be his last world tour, making this album initially more valuable. However, he has since toured the world several times, both on his own and with Steve Winwood.

There is also a DVD version of this album. The DVD features "Will It Go Round in Circles" sung by Billy Preston, which is not included on the CD. The DVD was directed by Brian Lockwood and Danny O'Bryen.

The album was released on vinyl for the first time on Record Store Day in 2019, on Limited Edition 3-LP clear vinyl.  The first 4 songs of the CD were on side one, with 3 songs on each of the other 5 sides of the 3 albums, the full 19 songs from the 2-CD set appearing across the 6 sides.

Track listing (CD)

Disc One
Acoustic:
 "Key to the Highway" (Broonzy, Charles Segar) – 3:41
 "Reptile" (Eric Clapton) – 5:59
 "Got You on My Mind" (Howard Biggs, Joe Thomas) – 3:51
 "Tears in Heaven" (Clapton, Will Jennings) – 4:34
 "Bell Bottom Blues" (Clapton) – 5:02
 "Change the World" (Gordon Kennedy, Wayne Kirkpatrick, Tommy Sims) – 6:16
Electric:
 "My Father's Eyes" (Clapton) – 8:34
 "River of Tears" (Clapton, Simon Climie) – 8:59
 "Going Down Slow" (Saint Louis Jimmy) – 5:34
 "She's Gone" (Clapton, Climie) – 6:58

Disc Two
Electric:
 "I Want a Little Girl" (Murray Mencher, Billy Moll) – 4:38
 "Badge" (Clapton, George Harrison) – 6:02
 "Hoochie Coochie Man" (Willie Dixon) – 4:30
 "Have You Ever Loved a Woman" (Billy Myles) – 7:53
 "Cocaine" (J. J. Cale) – 4:20
 "Wonderful Tonight" (Clapton) – 6:42
 "Layla" (Clapton, Jim Gordon) – 9:16
 "Sunshine of Your Love" (Jack Bruce, Clapton, Pete Brown) – 7:11
Acoustic:
 "Over the Rainbow" (Harold Arlen, E. Y. Harburg) – 6:33

Track listing (DVD)
 "Key to the Highway" (Broonzy, Segar) – 3:41
 "Reptile" (Eric Clapton) – 5:59
 "Got You on My Mind" (Biggs, Thomas) – 3:51
 "Tears in Heaven" (Clapton, Will Jennings) – 4:34
 "Bell Bottom Blues" (Clapton) – 5:02
 "Change the World" (Gordon Kennedy, Wayne Kirkpatrick, Tommy Sims) – 6:16
 "My Father's Eyes" (Clapton) – 8:34
 "River of Tears" (Clapton, Simon Climie) – 8:59
 "Going Down Slow" (Saint Louis Jimmy) – 5:34
 "She's Gone" (Clapton, Climie) – 6:58
 "I Want a Little Girl" (Mencher, Moll) – 4:38
 "Badge" (Clapton, George Harrison) – 6:02
 "(I'm Your) Hoochie Coochie Man" (Willie Dixon) – 4:30
 "Have You Ever Loved a Woman" (Billy Myles) – 7:53
 "Cocaine" (J. J. Cale) – 4:20
 "Wonderful Tonight" (Clapton) – 6:42
 "Layla" (Clapton, Jim Gordon) – 9:16
 "Will It Go Round in Circles" (Billy Preston) – 3:31
 "Sunshine of Your Love" (Peter Brown, Jack Bruce, Clapton) – 7:11
 "Over the Rainbow" (Harold Arlen, E. Y. Harburg) – 6:33

Personnel
Eric Clapton – guitar, lead vocals
Andy Fairweather-Low – guitar, backing vocals
Billy Preston – Hammond B-3 organ, keyboards, backing vocals
David Sancious – piano, keyboards, melodica, guitar, backing vocals
Greg Phillinganes - Hammond B-3 organ, keyboards/synthesizers
Nathan East – bass guitar, backing vocals
Steve Gadd – drums

Chart positions

Weekly charts

Certifications

!colspan="3"|Video sales
|-

References

Eric Clapton live albums
2002 live albums
Warner Records live albums
Albums produced by Simon Climie